Striolated puffbird is a common name for a broad species concept of Nystalus striolatus. The bird has been split into the following species:

Eastern striolated puffbird
Western striolated puffbird

Birds by common name